Rama University is located in Hapur and Kanpur in Uttar Pradesh, India. It is a private university and part of the Rama Group.

Faculties
Rama University comprises the following faculties:

 Faculty of Medical Sciences
 Faculty of Nursing
 Faculty of Dental Sciences
 Faculty of Health and Nutrition Sciences
 Faculty of Engineering and Technology
 Faculty of Commerce and Management
 Faculty of Professional Studies
 Faculty of Juridical Sciences (Law)
 Faculty of Agricultural Sciences and Allied Industries
 Faculty of Pharmaceutical Sciences
 Faculty of Paramedical Sciences

References

External links

Educational institutions established in 2014
Private universities in Uttar Pradesh
2014 establishments in Uttar Pradesh
Hapur